Hildegard Lehnert (1857-1943) was a German painter.

Biography
Lehnert was born in 1857 in Berlin, Germany. She studied painting under Clara Lobedan and Karl Gussow at the Berlin Academy. Lehnert exhibited her work at the Woman's Building at the 1893 World's Columbian Exposition in Chicago, Illinois.

Lehnert died in 1943.

Gallery

References

External links
  
 images of Lehnert's work on ArtNet

1857 births
1943 deaths
German women painters
19th-century German women artists
20th-century German women artists
19th-century German painters
20th-century German painters
Artists from Berlin